This is a list of Croatian television related events from 2005.

Events
26 February - Patrick Jurdić wins the second and final season of Hrvatski Idol.
30 December - Hamdija Seferović wins the second season of Big Brother.

Debuts

Television shows

2000s
Big Brother (2004-2008, 2016–present)
Zabranjena ljubav (2004-2008)

Ending this year
Hrvatski Idol (2004-2005)

Births

Deaths

See also
2005 in Croatia